The Royal Wellington Golf Club, (formerly Wellington Golf Club) founded in 1895, is one of New Zealand's most beautiful and historic golf courses. The Golf Club is situated in Heretaunga, Upper Hutt, just north of Wellington and alongside the Hutt River between Silverstream and Trentham.

History 

The club was first established in 1895 at Miramar, until it experienced difficulties in renewing its lease in 1904. The Barton family of Trentham and Wairarapa owned extensive land in the Heretaunga area in the Upper Hutt Valley and offered to sell club 48.5 hectares of their estate. This offer was accepted in a Club meeting on 20 November 1906 and subsequently much of the land was cleared and marshes drained to construct the rudimentary course. Some club members donated trees and shrubs in these early years.

By 1908 the club had completed its move to Heretaunga and an 18-hole course had been completed along with a tennis court, croquet and putting green. Its historic and elegant clubhouse was designed by architects Crichton and MacKay. The club was opened in a ceremony on 25 April 1908, by Joseph Ward, Prime Minister and president of the club.

Course 

The course was expanded from 18 to 27 holes in 1972–73. The present championship course was redesigned by Greg Turner and Scott Macpherson and opened in 2013. There is also a nine-hole Terrace course, which takes in some of the most scenic parts of the club's property. Royal Wellington Golf Course is the host venue for the 2017 Asia-Pacific Amateur Championship.

Championships 

Seven New Zealand Opens have been held at Heretaunga, the first in 1912, followed by 1932, 1954, 1976, 1981, 1987 and most recently in 1995, when Australian Lucas Parsons was the winner of the sixth and last open held at the club.

See also
List of golf clubs granted Royal status

References

External links
Royal Wellington Golf Club Website

Sports venues completed in 1895
Sport in Upper Hutt
Sports venues in Upper Hutt
Golf clubs and courses in New Zealand
Organisations based in New Zealand with royal patronage
1895 establishments in New Zealand
Royal golf clubs